Zhang Wei (born 31 March 1988) is a Chinese footballer currently playing as a left-back for Kunshan.

Career statistics

Club
.

References

1988 births
Living people
Chinese footballers
Association football defenders
China League One players
China League Two players
Tianjin Tianhai F.C. players
Yanbian Funde F.C. players
Kunshan F.C. players